Graham Simpson may refer to:

 Graham Simpson (businessman) (born 1946), former chairman of Watford F.C and owner of Simpson Travel
 Graham Simpson (doctor), practitioner of proactive medicine and founding member of American Holistic Medical Association
 Graham Simpson (musician) (1943–2012), founding member and bassist of Roxy Music
 Graham Simpson (politician), Scottish politician and Member of the Scottish Parliament for Central Scotland
 Graham Simpson (badminton), see Scotland at the 2002 Commonwealth Games